Enrique Víctor Aquiles Balmaceda Toro (3 March 1878 – 4 January 1962) was a Chilean politician, diplomat and son of President José Manuel Balmaceda. He was of Basque descent and a member of the Balmaceda family.

Balmaceda was born in Santiago in 1878, the seventh of eight children born to José Manuel Balmaceda Fernández and Emilia de Toro Herrera. He was baptised Enrique Víctor Aquiles. His mother was the granddaughter of Mateo de Toro Zambrano, 1st Count of La Conquista. Five of his siblings lived to adulthood. His father committed suicide in 1891, when Enrique was 13 years old.

Balmaceda started his political career by joining the Liberal Democratic Party and was promptly elected deputy for "Itata" (1906–1909) in a 1907 by-election to replace deputy Alberto Sanfuentes who had died, but lost his bid for reelection. In the congressional elections of 1918, he was elected deputy for "Castro" (1918–1921) and was reelected for the same region (1921–1924). On 12 May 1921, President Arturo Alessandri appointed him Minister of War and Navy, position he  held until 16 August 1921.

During the first administration of President Carlos Ibáñez he was appointed Minister of the Interior from 23 May 1927 to 24 February 1928; he concurrently served as interim Minister of Public Works and of Justice. During the second administration of President Ibáñez, he was appointed Ambassador to the United Kingdom. Balmaceda died in Santiago, in 1962, two months shy of his 84th birthday.

References

1878 births
1962 deaths
People from Santiago
Chilean people of Basque descent
Liberal Democratic Party (Chile, 1893) politicians
Chilean Ministers of Defense
Chilean Ministers of Health
Chilean Ministers of the Interior
Chilean Ministers of Justice
Chilean Ministers of Public Works
Deputies of the XXVIII Legislative Period of the National Congress of Chile
Deputies of the XXXII Legislative Period of the National Congress of Chile
Deputies of the XXXIII Legislative Period of the National Congress of Chile
Ambassadors of Chile to the United Kingdom